Johnnie Walker RVs (JWRV) is a recreational vehicle dealership and service center in the state of Nevada. Based in the Las Vegas Valley in Winchester, the company was founded in 1963 by John Walker, Sr., and has been family owned and operated for four generations. The company specializes in the sale, service and repair of motor homes, travel trailers, toy haulers and fifth wheels. The company also built and operates an Environmental Protection Agency (EPA) compliant paint booth to service all sized vehicles to prevent damage to the environment.

In May 2013, the company was featured on Discovery’s Animal Planet show Tanked, when a custom fish tank was built into a travel trailer. In October 2013, JWRV returned to reality television when they were featured on the season three finale of A&E’s Barter Kings, as a limo was traded for an RV.

History 
John Walker Sr. opened JWRV in 1963, after closing his family run grocery store, Stewards Market. The business started out selling mobile homes and expanded to Nomad travel trailers a few years later, taking one or two orders at a time. As demand increased for travel trailers, they changed their business model from mobile homes to recreational vehicles. The business has passed from John Walker, Sr. to John Walker, Jr., who ran the business until the early 2000s, when John Walker Jr.’s son, West Walker, assumed leadership of the company. The business originally started with one location and has since expanded to three locations along Boulder Highway. Today, the company is made up of about 65 employees; this includes numerous Walker family members.

 West Walker (third generation), President
Darcy Walker Fitch (third generation), Vice President
Shelly Walker Johnson  (third generation), Office Manager
Michael Walker (fourth generation), Marketing Director

Services 
JWRV operates three branches of their RV business: RV sales, RV Service and RV Parts. The RV sales side sells new and used RVs from such as Jayco, Forest River, Thor Motor Coach and Winnebago. JWRV is accredited by the Better Business Bureau, with an A+ rating as an RV Sales, Service and Parts establishment in Las Vegas.

In 2013, JWRV constructed a paint booth specifically designed to paint RVs of all sizes. The paint booth is EPA compliant and has been registered as such. Meeting compliance standards helps JWRV “to focus on meaningful risk reduction in the Collision Repair source sector to complement [their] ongoing community air toxics work and attain reductions at a faster rate.”

Reality Television

Tanked 
On May 31, 2013, JWRV was featured on Tanked, one of Discovery’s Animal Planet’s top-rated shows. The "Jurassic Campground" episode, which features one-of-a-kind fish tanks specially built by brothers-in-law, business partners, best friends and rivals, Wayde King and Brett Raymer, as they travel the country building show-stopping custom aquariums, exhibited the creation, building and revealing of Johnnie Walker RV’s custom RV aquarium. The aquarium was integrated into an Econ trailer, furnished by Pacific Coachworks. The tank is currently on display in the Johnnie Walker RV showroom.

Barter Kings 
JWRV made an appearance on the Season 3 finale episode of Barter Kings, a show on A&E. It features Antonio Palazzola and Steve McHugh as they trade items for better items without any currency exchange. The “Trading or Bust” episode follows the Barter Kings team as they attempt to trade a limo for an RV from JWRV. The show debuted on Tuesday, October 1, 2013.

References 

Companies based in Winchester, Nevada